Lone Butte is a  tuya in the Indian Heaven volcanic field, Washington, United States.  It is part of the Pacific Ring of Fire.

Lone Butte last erupted during either the Hayden Creek glaciation 130,000-150,000 years ago (late Illinoian), or 70,000-90,000 years ago during the early Wisconsin glaciation.

References

Volcanoes of Washington (state)
Tuyas of the United States
Cascade Volcanoes
Volcanoes of Skamania County, Washington
Mountains of Skamania County, Washington
Mountains of Washington (state)
Gifford Pinchot National Forest